Klausenberg is a mountain of the Chiemgau Alps in Bavaria, Germany.

Mountains of Bavaria
Chiemgau Alps
Mountains of the Alps